Abdul Rahman Ghaleb, known as Abu Sayed, was a Pakistani Islamic militant who led the Islamic State of Iraq and the Levant – Khorasan Province.

History

He was born in the 1980s in Bajaur Agency, part of the Federally Administered Tribal Areas of Pakistan. In the 1990s he joined Tehreek-e-Nafaz-e-Shariat-e-Mohammadi and later fought alongside the Taliban in Afghanistan. After the fall of the Taliban government in 2001, he returned to Bajaur for Islamic studies and was promoted to be a qadi for TSNM. He was close to Mawlawi Faqir Mohammed, a TNSM leader, and joined the Tehrik-i-Taliban Pakistan alongside him in 2007.

By 2011, Abdul Rahman was the deputy to the TTP leader in Bajaur. He was falsely reported dead after a 2012 airstrike killed the TTP chief in Bajaur, Jamal Syed ("Dadullah").

Dadullah was replaced by Abu Bakr as chief of Bajaur under the TTP, and when Abu Bakr joined Islamic State of Iraq and the Levant – Khorasan Province in February 2014, Abdul Rahman followed him. In late August 2016, Abdul Rahman was the emir for Nangarhar province and reported to be a deputy of Abdul Haseeb Logari.

Abdul Rahman was a driving force behind the expansion of IS operations to Kunar province.

In April 2017 he was interviewed by ISKP's Khilafat Ghag Radio and said jihad will continue "until conquering the United States, Sweden, and Germany, and converting its citizens to tawhid".

Death

He was reported killed in a drone strike on  11 July 2017 in Watapur District of Kunar Province by the United States.

References

Islamic State of Iraq and the Levant in Afghanistan
Islamic State of Iraq and the Levant members
Leaders of Islamic terror groups
People from Bajaur District
Tehrik-i-Taliban Pakistan
Tehrik-i-Taliban Pakistan members
Islamic State of Iraq and the Levant and Pakistan
Pakistani Islamists
1980 births
2017 deaths